Falls City may refer to:

Places in the United States
Falls City, Nebraska
Falls City, Oregon
Falls City, Texas
Falls City, Wisconsin
Louisville, Kentucky, nicknamed "Falls City"

Other uses
Falls City Brewing Company, a brewing company that operated in Louisville from 1905 to 1978

See also
 Fall City, Washington